Dhanotu may refer to:

Dhanotu, Mandi district, a village in Mandi district
Dhanotu, Kangra district, a village in Kangra district

Both villages are located in the state of Himachal Pradesh in India.